One Good Turn is a 1931 American Pre-Code short comedy film starring Laurel and Hardy. This film was the first Laurel and Hardy film to feature support from Billy Gilbert.

Plot
Stan and Ollie are suffering during the Great Depression and begging for food. A friendly old lady provides them with some sandwiches. Enjoying their meal, they hear that the old lady will be thrown out of her house because she is robbed and cannot pay her mortgage. They don't know that the old lady is rehearsing a play. Stan and Ollie decide to repay the old lady by selling their car. During the auction a drunken man (Billy Gilbert) puts a wallet in Stan's pocket. Ollie accuses Stan of having robbed the old lady, but when they return to the old lady's place they hear the truth. Stan takes revenge on Ollie.

Cast

Notes
Stan Laurel's daughter Lois was fearful of Oliver Hardy (known to her as "Uncle Babe") when her father was hit by Hardy in many Laurel and Hardy films. So, Laurel wrote a scene in which Hardy was hit by him.

References

External links
 
 
 
 

1931 films
1931 comedy films
American black-and-white films
Films directed by James W. Horne
Laurel and Hardy (film series)
Films with screenplays by H. M. Walker
1931 short films
American comedy short films
1930s American films